This is a list of conflicts in Angola arranged chronologically from the early modern period to the present day. This list includes nationwide and international wars, including: wars of independence, liberation wars, colonial wars, undeclared wars, proxy wars, territorial disputes, and world wars. Also listed might be any battle that occurred within the territory of what is today known as the, "Republic of Angola" but was itself only part of an operation of a campaign in a theater of a war. There may also be periods of violent civil unrest listed, such as: riots, shootouts, spree killings, massacres, terrorist attacks, and civil wars. The list might also contain episodes of: human sacrifice, mass suicide, massacres, and genocides.

Early modern period

Kingdom of Kongo

c. 1506 – c. 1543 Afonso I of Kongo's Rise to Power
1506  Battle of Mbanza Kongo
1588–1654 Dutch–Portuguese War
29 October 1647 Battle of Kombi
1622 Kongo-Portuguese War
18 December 1622 Battle of Mbumbi
1665–1709 Kongo Civil War
30 October 1665 Battle of Mbwila
June 1670 Battle of Mbidizi River
18 October 1670 Battle of Kitombo
15 February 1709 Battle of São Salvador

Kingdom of Matamba

4 September 1681 Battle of Katole

Contemporary history

Portuguese Angola

4 February 1961 – 25 April 1974  Angolan War of Independence
11 November 1975 – 4 April 2002 Angolan Civil War
September 1987  – March 1988 Battle of Cuito Cuanavale
8 November 1975 – Present Cabinda War

See also

Angolan Armed Forces
Angolan Army
Angolan Navy
National Air Force of Angola
Military history of Africa
African military systems up until the year 1800 CE
African military systems between the years 1800 CE and 1900 CE
African military systems after the year 1900 CE

Military history of Angola
Conflicts